Masuku is the former name of Franceville, a city in Gabon. It is also an African surname that may refer to:
Bandile Masuku, South African politician
Bongani Masuku, South African vocalist 
Davidson Masuku (1940–2000), South African military commander and physician
Ernest Masuku (born 1992), Zimbabwean cricketer 
Khethokwakhe Masuku (born 1985), South African association football player 
Lookout Masuku (1940–1986), commander of the Zimbabwe People's Revolutionary Army 
Madala Masuku, South African government official 
Mkhabela Masuku, Zimbabwean born Lawyer and social commentator 
Mario Masuku (1951–2021), Swazi politician
Menzi Masuku (born 1993), South African football midfielder 
Mkhuphali Masuku (born 1980), Zimbabwean football manager and former player 
Themba N. Masuku, Swazi politician who has served as Deputy Prime Minister of Eswatini since 2018 and as Acting Prime Minister from 2020 to 2021

Bantu-language surnames
Masuku is a South African surname usually in the Nguni people Masuku means at night ..
It is the 4th popular surname.